The Abolition of Feudal Tenure etc. (Scotland) Act 2000 was a land reform enforced by an Act of the Scottish Parliament that was passed by the Scottish Parliament on 3 May 2000, and received Royal Assent on 9 June 2000.

Provisions 
The Act officially brought to an end  annual feu duties, a vestige of feudal land tenure, on 28 November 2004 (that is, Martinmas, as the Act required the "appointed day" to be one of the Scottish term days). Tommy Sheridan was one of a number of MSPs who drove this change through the Scottish Parliament.  After that date, the former vassal of an estate was the sole owner of the land, and the former superior's rights were extinguished. For a further two years, the superior had the option of claiming compensation; this was fixed at a single payment of a size that, when invested at an annual rate of 2.5%, would yield interest equal to the former feu duty. Because inflation had eroded the value of duties, which had been fixed many years before, this payment was in most cases extremely small compared with the current value of the land.

In consequence of this change in the legal basis of land-holding, the Act also reformulated the legal basis on which conditions on the use of land can be specified in the title to ownership of that land. Such title conditions (known variously as real burdens and real conditions in the prior law) were combined into "real burdens". Prior to the Act, a superior could choose to enforce title conditions, or grant a consent or waiver (usually for payment) allowing the land owner to disregard the condition even if otherwise neighbouring property owners might wish to enforce the condition. Existing conditions which were enforceable only by the superior were abolished, and only conditions enforceable by the owners of neighbouring property or by certain legal bodies on public policy grounds were retained. Transitional arrangements allowed superiors who were also neighbouring property owners to convert the old title conditions to benefit their land and hence themselves as owners of that land rather than themselves as feudal superior.

Following this change in the legal basis for title conditions, the Title Conditions (Scotland) Act 2003 was passed, reconstituting the mechanics of how new real burdens and servitudes could be created. These two Acts, together with a third Act (the Tenements (Scotland) Act 2004), commenced on 28 November 2004.

See also
Land reform in Scotland

References

External links

Legislation 
 Abolition of Feudal Tenure etc (Scotland) Act 2000

Literature 
 Andrew J. M. Steven: "Revolution in Scottish Land Law " in: Electronic Journal of Comparative Law 8.3 (October 2004)
 David Sellar: "Farewell to Feudalism" in: Burke's Landed Gentry of Great Britain: The Kingdom in Scotland. Edited by Peter Beauclerk Dewar. Wilmington, DE 192001, pp. xix - xxi

Land reform in Scotland
Real property law
Feudalism in Scotland
Acts of the Scottish Parliament 2000